Wing & Mahurin was an architectural firm of Fort Wayne, Indiana.  Its principal partners were John F. Wing (1852-1947) and Marshall S. Mahurin (1857-1939), who were partners until 1907.  Together with Guy M. Mahurin (1877-1941) they worked also as Mahurin & Mahurin.

A number of its works are listed on the U.S. National Register of Historic Places.

Works by these architects include (with attribution):
Allen County Orphans' Home, Fort Wayne, Indiana
John H. Bass Mansion, aka "Brookside," Fort Wayne, Indiana (Wing & Mahurin), NRHP-listed
Beech Grove Cemetery, 1400 W. Kilgore Ave. Muncie, IN (Mahurin, Marshall S., et al.), NRHP-listed
Hon. R. C. Bell Residence, Fort Wayne, Indiana
Dr. D. S. Brown Residence, Fort Wayne, Indiana
Carnegie Library (Muncie, Indiana) (Wing & Mahurin)
Central Fire Station, Fort Wayne, Indiana
Defiance Public Library, 320 Fort St. Defiance, Ohio (Mahurin,M.S.), NRHP-listed
Charles Dugan House, 420 W. Monroe St. Decatur, Indiana (Wing & Mahurin), NRHP-listed
Engine House No. 3, 226 W. Washington Blvd., Fort Wayne, Indiana (Wing & Mahurin), NRHP-listed
Fort Wayne City Hall, Fort Wayne, Indianabuilt 1893, Richardsonian Romanesque-style government building, (John F. Wing and Marshall S. Mahurin), NRHP-listed
The Fort Wayne Saengerbund Building, Fort Wayne, Indiana
Greenfield High School, Greenfield, Indiana
Hancock County Courthouse, Greenfield, Indiana
The Humphrey & Hughes Block, Van Wert, Ohio
Indiana State School for Feeble-Minded Children, Fort Wayne, Indiana
Kokomo City Building, 221 W. Walnut St. Kokomo, IN (Wing & Mahurin), NRHP-listed
Kosciusko County Infirmary, Warsaw, Indiana
Lindenwood Cemetery Receiving Vault and Crematory (also a number of private vaults), Fort Wayne, Indiana
Marshall S. Mahuin Residence, Fort Wayne, Indiana
Marshall County Infirmary, 10924 Lincoln Highway, Plymouth, Indiana (Wing & Mahurin), NRHP-listed
Masonic Temple, Wabash, Indiana
The McDonald & Taylor Fire-Proof Building, Fort Wayne, Indiana
Monroe County Courthouse, Courthouse Sq. Bloomington, IN (Wing & Guy M. Mahurin), NRHP-listed
Monroe County Infirmary, Bloomington, Indiana
Muncie Public Library, 301 E. Jackson St. Muncie, IN (Mahurin, Marshall S.), NRHP-listed
Old People's Home, Avilla, Indiana
Ottawa County Courthouse, W. 4th and Madison Sts. Port Clinton, OH (Wing & Mahurin), NRHP-listed
J. S. Peabody Residence, Columbia City, Indiana
Saint Paul's Evangelical Lutheran Church, 1126 S. Barr St., Fort Wayne, Indiana (Wing & Mahurin), NRHP-listed
Starke County Courthouse, built 1897, Courthouse Sq. Knox, IN (Wing & Mahurin; Caldwell & Drake), NRHP-listed
Sullivan County Poor Home, Sullivan, Indiana
Union City School, 310 N Walnut St Union City, IN (Mahurin & Mahurin), NRHP-listed
US Post Office and Courthouse, 1300 W. Harrison St., Fort Wayne, Indiana (Mahurin, Guy), NRHP-listed
Wabash High School, Wabash, Indiana
One or more works in West Wabash Historic District, bounded roughly by the Northfolk Southern RR and Union St., Wabash and Miami Sts., Main St., Holliday St. Wabash, IN (Wing & Mahurin), NRHP-listed
One or more works in Williams–Woodland Park Historic District, roughly bounded by Hoagland and Creighton Aves. and Harrison and Pontiac Sts., Fort Wayne, Indiana (Mahurin, Marshall), NRHP-listed
White National Bank, Fort Wayne, Indiana
One or more works in Downtown Auburn Historic District, roughly bounded by E. and W. Fourth, N. and S. Cedar, E. Twelfth, and N. and S. Jackson Sts. Auburn, IN (Mahurin & Mahurin), NRHP-listed
One or more works in Minnetrista Boulevard Historic District, 400-650 Minnetrista Blvd., Muncie, IN (Marshall S. Mahurin), NRHP-listed
The Zion's Lutheran Church, Fort Wayne, Indiana
Thomas & Donna Neshek Residence, Elkhorn, WI (Marshall S. Mahurin)

References

Architecture firms based in Indiana